Yuri: Sí, soy así is the fourth album by Mexican iconic pop singer Yuri. It was released in 1983.

Track listing Latin America Edition

Track listing Spain Edition

Production
 Producer: Rafael Trabucchelli
 Musical arrangements: Rafael Trabucchelli and A. Serrano
 Sound engineer: Angel Barco
 Country of recording: Spain

Singles
 "Yo te amo, te amo"
 "Solos"
 "Sólos tú y yo"
 "Si, soy así" (Only in Spain)
 "Vuelve"

1983 albums
Yuri (Mexican singer) albums